Events from the year 1837 in Ireland.

Events
 Shaw's Bank merges with the Royal Bank of Ireland (later to become one of the Allied Irish Banks).
 8 April - Low-water mark datum measured at Poolbeg Lighthouse by the Ordnance Survey.
 August – following a very cold summer there is widespread failure of the potato crop, as in 1836, leading to famine later in the year.
 18 August – the Roman Catholic Tuam Cathedral is dedicated.
 4 September – , badly damaged during an Arctic expedition, is beached at Lough Swilly to save her.

Arts and literature
 February – Charles Lever begins publishing his fictional The Confessions of Harry Lorrequer in Dublin University Magazine.
 Thomas Crofton Croker publishes Popular Songs of Ireland.
 Tyrone Power stages and acts in the Irish-themed plays St. Patrick's Eve (written by himself) and Rory O'More (adapted from Samuel Lover's novel).

Births
16 March – Frederick Wolseley, inventor of the sheep shearing machine (died 1899 in the United Kingdom).
7 May – John Michael Clancy, Democrat United States Representative from New York (died 1903 in the United States).
24 May – John McDonald, soldier and Congressman in America (died 1917 in the United States).
28 May – George Ashlin, architect (died 1921).
1 August (bapt.) – Mary Harris Jones ("Mother Jones"), labor leader in America (died 1930 in the United States).
7 August
James Brenan, painter (died 1907).
Allan James Foley ("Signor Foli"), operatic bass singer (died 1899 in the United Kingdom).
4 September – Edward Gibson, 1st Baron Ashbourne, lawyer and Lord Chancellor of Ireland (died 1913).
1 October – Edward James Saunderson, leader of the Irish Unionist Party in the British House of Commons (died 1906).
Full date unknown
Patrick Graham, recipient of the Victoria Cross for gallantry in 1857 at Lucknow, India (died 1875).

Deaths
20 January – Arthur Gore, 3rd Earl of Arran, politician (born 1761).
23 January – John Field, composer and pianist (born 1782).
1 February – Edward Donovan, writer, traveller and amateur zoologist (born 1768).
27 February – Lord Kingsborough, antiquarian (born 1795).
20 June – William IV of the United Kingdom of Great Britain and Ireland (born 1765).
13 July – William Hare, 1st Earl of Listowel, peer and MP (born 1751).
24 November – Richard Trench, 2nd Earl of Clancarty, diplomat, Irish, and later British, MP (born 1767).
Full date unknown
Gilbert Austin, educator, clergyman and author (Rborn 1753).

References

 
Years of the 19th century in Ireland
1830s in Ireland
Ireland
 Ireland